Sardar Yar Muhammad Rind is a Pakistani politician who is member  of the Provincial Assembly of the Balochistan. He is the President of Pakistan Tehreek-e-Insaf Balochistan Chapter and Parliamentary Leader of PTI in Provincial Assembly of Balochistan.

Rind is the Parliamentary Leader of PTI in Provincial Assembly of Balochistan since 2018 Balochistan Provincial Elections.

He is serving as the Special Assistant to Prime Minister on Activities pertaining to Ministries of Water Resources, Power and Petroleum in the Balochistan in the Federal Cabinet of Pakistan since 20 March 2019.

He is also serving as the Provincial Minister for Secondary Education & Colleges, Technical & Higher Education in the Provincial Cabinet of Balochistan since 23 January 2020.

Rind is the President of Pakistan Tehreek-e-Insaf for Balochistan since 2015.

He has served as the Leader of the Opposition in the Provincial Assembly of Balochistan from 2008 till 2013.

He served as a Federal Minister from 2002 to 2007 during the government of Pakistan Muslim League (Q).

He has been elected as a Senator, MNA and MPA various times since 1985 till date.

References

External links
https://dunyanews.tv/en/Pakistan/483750-Yar-Muhammad-Rind-appointed-as-Special-Assistant-to-PM/

Living people
Pakistan Tehreek-e-Insaf MPAs (Balochistan)
Politicians from Balochistan, Pakistan
1956 births
Pakistani MNAs 1990–1993
Pakistani MNAs 1993–1996
Pakistani MNAs 1997–1999
Pakistani MNAs 2002–2007